Carapa megistocarpa is a species of flowering plant in the family Meliaceae. It is endemic to Ecuador, where it is a tree of coastal forests. It is endangered by deforestation and is harvested for timber.

References

Endemic flora of Ecuador
megistocarpa
Endangered plants
Taxonomy articles created by Polbot